Al Ahmadi is a town founded in 1946 with the discovery of oil there, located in Al Ahmadi Governorate, Kuwait.

Al Ahmadi is a district located in the south of the country. It contains the headquarters for the Kuwait National Petroleum Company (KNPC) and Kuwait Oil Company (KOC) with many of its refineries located there.

History 
Covering an area of 60 km2. it has a population of about 394,000. Al Ahmadi is the capital of this Kuwait province with the same name. Al Ahmadi Province, named after Ahmad Al-Jaber Al-Sabah, was created in 1946. Sheikh Ahmad Al-Jaber Al-Sabah ruled the province from 1921 to 1956.

During the beginning of 1940s British and Indian ex-pats started settling in Al Ahmadi. The town has American layouts and designed keeping in mind British preferences. The roads intersect at right angles. Areas close to the sea have buildings on the sea-facing hill slopes. The Ahmadi Town was divided by Orientation into North, South, East, and West. The North Ahmadi side is where the residential area is prominent. It also boasts of a recreational club called the Hubara, the Kuwait Golf Club Course is located here.

References

Suburbs of Kuwait City